Bactridinae is a subtribe of plants in the family Arecaceae found in the New World. Genera in the subtribe are:

Acrocomia – Americas
Astrocaryum – Americas
Aiphanes – NW South America, Caribbean
Bactris – South America, Central America, Caribbean
Desmoncus – South America, Central America

See also 
 List of Arecaceae genera

References

External links 

 
Arecaceae subtribes